The Zagreb train disaster occurred on 30 August 1974 when an express train (number 10410) traveling from Belgrade, Yugoslavia, to Dortmund, West Germany, derailed before entering Zagreb Main Station (present-day Croatia), killing 153 people. It was the worst rail accident in Yugoslavia's history to that date and remains one of the worst in Europe's history.

The accident
The accident occurred when all nine cars from a passenger express train derailed and rolled over at the entrance to Zagreb's main train station,  from the entrance to Track IIa. At 22:33 hours the locomotive entered the station via Track IIa without any of its carriages.

Many of the passengers died immediately; as many as 41 of whom could not be identified were buried in a common grave at the Mirogoj Cemetery.

The surviving passengers reported that the train had not slowed while passing through the stations at Ludina and Novoselec, about an hour before reaching Zagreb Main Station, and that it had been leaning dangerously.

The passengers were mainly gastarbeiters (guest workers) working in West Germany and their families, which included many children. The driver and driver's assistant were uninjured, and the locomotive remained intact. The locomotive is now on display in the Croatian Railway Museum.

The train was scheduled to arrive in Zagreb from Vinkovci at 19:45 local time. The driver, Nikola Knežević, and his assistant, Stjepan Varga, were both exhausted, having worked for two full days.

The crew also applied the brakes too late, so that the train quickly derailed into an unrecognizable wreck.

Aftermath
The engineer was sentenced to 15 years imprisonment, and his assistant to 8 years. The court upheld their fatigue due to spending 52 hours working as a mitigating circumstance.

References

External links 
 This Day in History 1974: Train crashes into station in Yugoslavia (History Channel)
 Danger Ahead! Zagreb 1974
 Search For Bodies Continues Following Yugoslavia's Worst Rail Disaster. (31 August 1974, British Pathé TV)

Railway accidents in 1974
Derailments in Croatia
1970s in Zagreb
1974 in Croatia
August 1974 events in Europe
Derailments in Yugoslavia